Gwiwa is a Local Government Area of Jigawa State, Nigeria. Its headquarters are in the town of Gwiwa which is a reminiscent of Kagara, a settlement that flourished around 1757c. According to oral tradition, Kagara was ransacked by an expedition sent by Bawa-jangwarzo as part of the wars that ensued between Katsina and Gobir. At that time the area was under the kingdom of Katsina until 1824 when Kazaure Emirate was curved out by the Sakkwato Caliphate. A number of legendary wells surround the old site of Kagara which is about 2 kilometers northwest of the present day Gwiwa town. The number of these wells suggest the size and influence of Kagara at that point in time. Other artefacts could also be found to illuminate on the historical significance of the area. There also exists a vast forest which served as fortress as well as pasture during intertribal wars before the advert of the Sakkwato Jihad in the 18th century. Gwiwa town was once a district headquarters at the inception of the indirect rule by the British. However, this was reverted and Gwiwa was reduced to a colonial out-post until in 1992 when it was made a Local Government headquarters. Generally, the area is arable and fertile. However the land is mainly of Katsina basic complex especially northward of Gwiwa. While some traces of sand dumes are found in the southern part of the local Government Area. It had an area of 450 km2 and a population of 124,517 at the 2006 census.

The postal code of the area is 705.

References

Local Government Areas in Jigawa State